Kwame Hasani Brown (born March 10, 1982) is an American former professional basketball player who spent 12 seasons in the National Basketball Association (NBA). Selected by the Washington Wizards in the 2001 NBA draft, Brown was the first No. 1 overall pick to be chosen straight out of high school and the 16th player from high school to be drafted into the NBA. He also played for the Los Angeles Lakers, Memphis Grizzlies, Detroit Pistons, Charlotte Bobcats, Golden State Warriors, and Philadelphia 76ers. His performance as a first overall draft pick has led many analysts to label him as one of the biggest busts in NBA history.

High school
Brown was consistently rated as the "best high school player" in his class, which also included high school standouts Eddy Curry and Tyson Chandler. He was the high school player of the year as a senior in Georgia. Brown finished his high school career at the historic Glynn Academy (in Brunswick, Georgia) as the school's all-time leading rebounder (1,235) and shot-blocker (605), and also finished second all-time as a scorer (1,539 points). He was named to the 2001 McDonald's All-American Team. His senior averages were 20.1 points, 13.3 rebounds, 5.8 blocks, 3 assists and 2 steals per game. While Brown was a senior, Glynn produced a 24–7 record and reached the Georgia State semifinals.

Professional career

Washington Wizards (2001–2005)
Originally signing a letter of intent to play for the University of Florida, he later declared for the 2001 NBA draft. The Washington Wizards, under team president Michael Jordan, used their first overall pick on him. Following a pre-draft workout with the Wizards, it has been reported that Brown told then-Wizards coach Doug Collins, "If you draft me, you'll never regret it."

Perhaps as a result of hype and high expectations, Brown's rookie season was marred by a lack of maturity and production on the court. In his rookie year, Brown averaged 4.5 points and 3.5 rebounds per game.

However, the Wizards believed in Brown's potential. In his second season as a professional, Brown saw more action in the league. He started 20 out of the 80 games he played and the total minutes he played doubled. Brown improved his numbers, posting averages of 7.4 points and 5.3 rebounds per game. In his third season, Brown continued to improve, posting career highs in both points (10.9) and rebounds (7.4). He also in a game against the Sacramento Kings registered 30 points and 19 rebounds.

After his first three years in Washington, Brown rejected a five-year, $30 million contract offer, electing instead to test the free agent market when his contract expired after the season. In his fourth season, Brown was limited to 42 games due to injuries. His highest-scoring game of the season was 19 points, compared to his season-high of 30 the year before, and he averaged 7.0 points per game. Late in the season, criticism increased; he feuded with Gilbert Arenas, other teammates, and his coach Eddie Jordan.

Los Angeles Lakers (2005–2008)
On August 2, 2005, Brown and Laron Profit were traded to the Lakers in exchange for Caron Butler and Chucky Atkins. This move was met with some controversy from fans who disliked Brown's reputation and his label as an "under-achiever." In the beginning of the season, he averaged just above 6 points and 6 rebounds.

On December 26, 2005, he played his first game at the Washington Wizards' MCI Center (now known as Capital One Arena) as a Laker. The sold-out crowd of 20,173 fans loudly booed him upon entering the game and whenever he touched the ball. In the second quarter, Brown was looking the other way when teammate Sasha Vujačić threw a pass his way. The ball bounced off his head and landed out of bounds, which was met with loud cheers from the crowd. Brown called the reception "weak" and stated that "they should be cheering that I'm gone." The Wizards won the game 94–91.

When Lakers center Chris Mihm went down with a season-ending ankle injury on March 12, 2006, Brown took over the starting center position. During his stint as a center, he raised his averages from 6.1 points and 6.3 rebounds to 12.3 points and 9.1 rebounds and started every game for the Lakers in the playoffs.  Brown became a central part of the Lakers seven-game series with the Phoenix Suns.  Although they ended up losing the series, it had appeared that Kwame Brown's potential was beginning to show.

The surprising consistency Brown showed while playing center prompted Phil Jackson to make Brown the starting center in the 2006–07 season. Brown was injured at the beginning of the season and Mihm was also out with injury for the whole season, so the starting job at center was given to the young Andrew Bynum. After playing the majority of the minutes at center despite the bench role, he was given the starting job in early December.

Brown again became injured in the 2007–08 season which allowed Bynum to start again at the center position where he flourished. However, when Bynum suffered a knee injury that appeared to jeopardize the Lakers' playoff chances, Brown regained his starting position.

Memphis Grizzlies (2008)
On February 1, 2008,  Brown was traded along with Javaris Crittenton, Aaron McKie, the draft rights to Marc Gasol, and the Lakers' 2008 and 2010 first-round draft picks for Pau Gasol and a second-round pick in 2010. On July 1, 2008, the Memphis Grizzlies chose not to sign Brown to a new contract, making him an unrestricted free agent.

Detroit Pistons (2008–2010)
On July 28, 2008, ESPN.com reported that the Pistons signed Brown to a two-year deal worth $8 million, with the second year a player option.

Charlotte Bobcats (2010–2011)
On August 23, 2010, Brown signed a one-year deal with the Bobcats.

Golden State Warriors (2011–2012)
On December 14, 2011, Brown signed a one-year, $7 million contract with the Warriors.

Philadelphia 76ers (2012–2013) 
On March 13, 2012, Brown, along with Monta Ellis and Ekpe Udoh, was traded to the Milwaukee Bucks in exchange for Andrew Bogut and Stephen Jackson. Brown never played for the Bucks during the season.

On July 20, 2012, Brown signed a two-year contract for nearly $6 million with the Philadelphia 76ers. After sustaining a right hamstring strain in September 2013, Brown was waived by the 76ers on November 20 before appearing in a game for them in the 2013–14 season.

Post-NBA career
In 2017, Brown was the fifth overall pick in the inaugural draft of the BIG3 basketball league. In BIG3 Brown played for the 3 Headed Monsters, who made it to the finals and ended up losing to Trilogy 51–46.

In 2021, Brown created numerous YouTube videos critiquing the assertion that he was a 'bust" as a first round draft pick, claiming that mainstream U.S. sports media unfairly targeted him for over twenty years, as well as negatively depicting black men, in general. The videos were created in response to negative comments about Brown's career from former NBA players Matt Barnes and Stephen Jackson on a May 2021 episode of their podcast All the Smoke. Brown's response has led to a significant increase of social media attention, especially via YouTube and Instagram. Therefore, some journalists are now re-examining whether the "bust" label is legitimate.

Personal life
Brown's cousin Jabari Smith also played in the NBA. Smith's son, Jabari Smith Jr., also became an NBA player.

In 2002, Brown's hometown girlfriend, Joselyn Vaughn, moved into his Virginia home. Together they had three daughters. In 2019, Brown sued for custody of the children.

Legal issues

In August 2003, Brown was arrested and charged with driving under intoxication near his hometown of Brunswick. In October 2007, Brown was arrested in Georgia and charged with disorderly conduct and interference with a law enforcement officer after an incident in which the driver of a car in which he was a passenger was arrested for driving drunk with a suspended license.

Brown was arrested on March 31, 2019, by Georgia police and charged with felony possession of edible marijuana products and misdemeanor possession of less than one ounce of marijuana.

NBA career statistics

Regular season

|-
| align="left" | 
| align="left" | Washington
| 57 || 3 || 14.3 || .387 || .000 || .707 || 3.5 || .8 || .3 || .5 || 4.5
|-
| align="left" | 
| align="left" | Washington
| 80 || 20 || 22.2 || .446 || .000 || .668 || 5.3 || .7 || .6 || 1.0 || 7.4
|-
| align="left" | 
| align="left" | Washington
| 74 || 57 || 30.3 || .489 || .500 || .683 || 7.4 || 1.5 || .9 || .7 || 10.9
|-
| align="left" | 
| align="left" | Washington
| 42 || 14 || 21.6 || .460 || .000 || .574 || 4.9 || .9 || .6 || .4 || 7.0
|-
| align="left" | 
| align="left" | L.A. Lakers
| 72 || 49 || 27.5 || .526 || .000 || .545 || 6.6 || 1.0 || .4 || .6 || 7.4
|-
| align="left" | 
| align="left" | L.A. Lakers
| 41 || 28 || 27.6 || .591 || .000 || .440 || 6.0 || 1.8 || 1.0 || 1.2 || 8.4
|-
| align="left" | 
| align="left" | L.A. Lakers
| 23 || 14 || 22.1 || .515 || .000 || .406 || 5.7 || 1.2 || .7 || .8 || 5.7
|-
| align="left" | 
| align="left" | Memphis
| 15 || 1 || 13.6 || .487 || .000 || .412 || 3.8 || 1.1 || .4 || .3 || 3.5
|-
| align="left" | 
| align="left" | Detroit
| 58 || 30 || 17.2 || .533 || .000 || .516 || 5.0 || .6 || .4 || .4 || 4.2
|-
| align="left" | 
| align="left" | Detroit
| 48 || 1 || 13.8 || .500 || .000 || .337 || 3.7 || .5 || .3 || .3 || 3.3
|-
| align="left" | 
| align="left" | Charlotte
| 66 || 50 || 26.0 || .517 || .000 || .589 || 6.8 || .7 || .4 || .6 || 7.9
|-
| align="left" | 
| align="left" | Golden State
| 9 || 3 || 20.8 || .525 || .000 || .441 || 6.3 || .4 || .9 || .0 || 6.3
|-
| align="left" | 
| align="left" | Philadelphia
| 22 || 11 || 12.2 || .459 || .000 || .368 || 3.4 || .4 || .3 || .5 || 1.9
|- class="sortbottom"
| style="text-align:center;" colspan="2"| Career
| 607 || 281 || 22.1 || .492 || .111 || .570 || 5.5 || .9 || .5 || .6 || 6.6

Playoffs

|-
| align="left" | 2005
| align="left" | Washington
| 3 || 0 || 20.0 || .385 || .000 || .556 || 5.0 || 1.0 || .0 || .7 || 5.0
|-
| align="left" | 2006
| align="left" | L.A. Lakers
| 7 || 7 || 32.1 || .523 || .000 || .710 || 6.6 || 1.0 || .3 || .9 || 12.9
|-
| align="left" | 2007
| align="left" | L.A. Lakers
| 5 || 5 || 26.6 || .528 || .000 || .556 || 5.6 || .2 || .2 || .8 || 8.6
|-
| align="left" | 2009
| align="left" | Detroit
| 3 || 0 || 16.0 || .375 || .000 || .750 || 5.0 || .0 || .0 || 1.0 || 3.0
|- class="sortbottom"
| style="text-align:center;" colspan="2"| Career
| 18 || 12 || 25.9 || .500 || .000 || .660 || 5.8 || .6 || .2 || .8 || 8.7

References

External links

NBA.com player profile 
NBA Draft profile

1982 births
Living people
African-American basketball players
American men's basketball players
American YouTubers
American media critics
Basketball players from South Carolina
Basketball players from Georgia (U.S. state)
Big3 players
Centers (basketball)
Commentary YouTubers
Detroit Pistons players
Golden State Warriors players
Los Angeles Lakers players
McDonald's High School All-Americans
Memphis Grizzlies players
National Basketball Association high school draftees
Parade High School All-Americans (boys' basketball)
People from Brunswick, Georgia
Power forwards (basketball)
Sportspeople from Charleston, South Carolina
Washington Wizards draft picks
Washington Wizards players
21st-century African-American sportspeople
20th-century African-American people
American men's 3x3 basketball players